"Flying the Flag (For You)" is a song performed by British pop/bubblegum dance group Scooch. The official single version was available from 30 April 2007 and was released as a physical CD single in the following week, on 7 May 2007. The song debuted on the UK Singles Chart at No. 5 and peaked at this position. It also charted in Ireland at number 48.

Song information
Scooch had reformed in hope of performing at the Eurovision Song Contest 2007, and the song was specifically written for the contest; Eurovision rules state that the song must be an original composition and released no more than seven months before the contest. Spencer, as the captain, opens and closes the song with captain's announcements. Powers and Barnes sing the vocals of the song, as Ducasse offers passengers confectioneries. The lyrics are heavily based on actual experiences of flying. The song contains a liberal amount of sexual innuendo, the most overt being "...and blow into the mouthpiece" and "would you like something to suck on for landing, sir?" (the latter was omitted or changed for some tea-time television performances).

Music video
The original music video was their final performance on Eurovision: Making Your Mind Up; Scooch recorded a new version once their contract with Warner Bros. had been signed.
Following the lyrics, the second video starts with the quartet in the front of the aeroplane, with Spencer as the captain. The video continues with all of the members as stewards walking up and down the plane, with a cameo appearance from Sister Mary McArthur, who was invited to take part after the band saw her lip sync video. Later in the video each member of the band is seen dancing in front of the flags of selected countries that are all participating in the Eurovision Song Contest 2007, in addition to the flag of Europe.

"Flying the Flag" in Helsinki

"Flying the Flag (FoFor You)" was the nineteenth song to be sung during the Eurovision Song Contest. Due to the low score that Scooch had received — only the Irish entry "They Can't Stop the Spring" was lower on the scoreboard— the song received negative press by newspapers, in particular by The Sunday Mirror who stated that the song made the United Kingdom "the laughing stock of Europe", The Sunday Times referred to the song saying "it wasn't a disaster – more of a crash landing".

International promotion
On 18 April 2007 it was announced that Scooch had been signed to the Warner Bros. label. This would help them to promote and release their single to a broader range of fans in the United Kingdom and abroad. As part of the contract, Scooch recorded certain phrases of the song in French, German, Spanish, Bulgarian, and Danish.

Track listings and formats
CD
 "Flying The Flag (For You)" [Eurovision 2007 Version] (3:04)
 "Flying The Flag (For You)" [Karaoke Version] (3:04)

DVD
 "Flying the Flag (For You)" [Video]
 "How To" Special Scooch Dance Feature [Video]
 "Flying the Flag (For You)" [Karaoke Version] [Video]
 "Flying the Flag (For You)" [Audio]

Charts

Weekly charts

Year-end charts

References

Eurovision songs of 2007
Eurovision songs of the United Kingdom
2007 singles
2007 songs
Warner Records singles
British pop songs